Family with sequence similarity 69, member C is a protein that in humans is encoded by the FAM69C gene.

Function 

This gene encodes a member of the FAM69 family of cysteine-rich type II transmembrane proteins. These proteins localize to the endoplasmic reticulum but their specific functions are unknown.

References

Further reading